Castello di Ortona dei Marsi (Italian for Castle of Ortona dei Marsi)  is a  Middle Ages castle in Ortona dei Marsi, Province of L'Aquila (Abruzzo).

History

Architecture

References

External links

Ortona dei Marsi
Ortona dei Marsi